Gary Fox (born 11 April 1990) is a male badminton player from England. He won a bronze medal at the  2009 European Junior Badminton Championships in mixed team event.

Achievements

BWF International Challenge/Series
Mixed Doubles

 BWF International Challenge tournament
 BWF International Series tournament
 BWF Future Series tournament

References

External links
 

1990 births
Living people
Sportspeople from Bolton
English male badminton players